The Pitze (also: Pitzbach) is a river in the Imst district, Tyrol, Austria, a right tributary of the river Inn.

The Pitze flows through the Pitztal valley, a southern branch of the Inntal.

References

External links

Rivers of Tyrol (state)
Rivers of Austria